United Nations Security Council resolution 685, adopted unanimously on 31 January 1991, after recalling resolutions 598 (1987), 618 (1988), 631 (1989), 642 (1989), 651 (1990), 671 (1990) and 676 (1990), and having considered a report by the Secretary-General Javier Pérez de Cuéllar on the United Nations Iran–Iraq Military Observer Group, the Council decided:

(a) to renew the mandate of the United Nations Iran–Iraq Military Observer Group for one more month until 28 February 1991;
(b) to request the Secretary-General, after discussions with both parties, to report on the future of the Observer Group with his recommendations during February 1991.

See also
 Iran–Iraq relations
 Iran–Iraq War
 List of United Nations Security Council Resolutions 601 to 700 (1987–1991)

References
Text of the Resolution at undocs.org

External links
 

 0685
 0685
1991 in Iran
1991 in Iraq
January 1991 events